Acta Biológica Colombiana is a quarterly peer-reviewed open access scientific journal covering all aspects of biology with special emphasis on the Neotropics. It is published by the Science Faculty of the National University of Colombia and was established in 1982. The editor-in-chief is Gabriel Antonio Pinilla Agudelo. The journal is available online from its homepage and from Redalyc and SciELO.

See information about management and spreading of content in BioNotasUN

Abstracting and indexing
The journal is abstracted and indexed in:
Biological Abstracts
BIOSIS Previews
CASSI
Latindex
LILACS
Scopus
The Zoological Record
SciELO
Publindex categoría A2
Redalyc
DOAJ

References

External links

Biology journals
Quarterly journals
Multilingual journals
Publications established in 1982
National University of Colombia
Spanish-language journals